Opatoro is a municipality in the Honduran department of La Paz.

Demographics
At the time of the 2013 Honduras census, Opatoro municipality had a population of 7,408. Of these, 91.90% were Indigenous (91.77% Lenca), 7.33% Mestizo, 0.55% White, 0.18% Black or Afro-Honduran and 0.03% others.

References

Municipalities of the La Paz Department (Honduras)